The 1957 European Judo Championships were the 6th edition of the European Judo Championships, and were held in Rotterdam in the Netherlands on 10 November 1957.

Medal winners

References

External links

 

European Judo Championships
E
Judo competitions in the Netherlands
Judo
International sports competitions hosted by the Netherlands
Sports competitions in Rotterdam
Judo